Martin Emerich (April 27, 1846 – September 25, 1922) was a U.S. Representative from Illinois.

Born in Baltimore, Maryland, Emerich attended the public schools. He engaged in the importing business. He was appointed ward commissioner of the poor of Baltimore in 1870. He served as member of the Maryland House of Delegates 1881–1883. He served as aide-de-camp to Governor William T. Hamilton 1880–1884, and to Governor Elihu E. Jackson 1884–1887. He moved to Chicago, Illinois in 1887 and engaged in mercantile pursuits until 1896, when he engaged in the manufacture of bricks. He served as member of the Board of Commissioners of Cook County 1892–1894. He served as assessor of South Chicago 1897.

Emerich was elected as a Democrat to the Fifty-eighth Congress (March 4, 1903 – March 3, 1905). He was not a candidate for renomination in 1904. He retired in 1905. He died while on a visit in New York City on September 25, 1922, at age 76, and was interred in Rosehill Cemetery in Chicago.

Electoral history

See also 
List of Jewish members of the United States Congress

References

External links

Martin Emerich at The Political Graveyard

1846 births
1922 deaths
Burials at Rosehill Cemetery
Jewish members of the United States House of Representatives
Members of the Cook County Board of Commissioners
Members of the Maryland House of Delegates
Politicians from Baltimore
Politicians from Chicago
Democratic Party members of the United States House of Representatives from Illinois